Pietro Avogadro (died c. 1730) was an Italian painter of the Rococo period. He was born in Brescia and trained with Pompeo Ghiti. He is mentioned by the biographer Luigi Lanzi. Among his works are a Martyrdom of Saints Crispin for the church of San Giuseppe in Brescia. He is also sometimes referred to as Bresciano Avogadro.

References

1730 deaths
18th-century Italian painters
Italian male painters
Painters from Brescia
Italian Baroque painters
Year of birth unknown
18th-century Italian male artists